Octanoyl-coenzyme A is the endpoint of beta oxidation in peroxisomes.  It is produced alongside acetyl-CoA and transferred to the mitochondria to be further oxidized into acetyl-CoA.

See also 
Caprylic acid, the eight-carbon saturated fatty acid known by the systematic name octanoic acid.

References

Thioesters of coenzyme A